Stefan Antonić (born 6 February 2001)  is an Indonesian professional footballer of partial Serbian descent who plays as a defender for Hong Kong Premier League club Sham Shui Po.

Club career

Southern
In 2020, Antonić signed a contract with Hong Kong Premier League club Southern. He made his professional debut in the HKPL on 5 May 2021, against Resources Capital where he played as a starter .

Sham Shui Po
In October 2022, Antonić joined Sham Shui Po.

Personal life
He is the son of football manager Dejan Antonić. He graduated from YMCA of Hong Kong Christian College in 2019.

Career statistics

Club

Notes

References

2001 births
Living people
Indonesian footballers
Serbian footballers
Association football defenders
Hong Kong Premier League players
Southern District FC players
Sham Shui Po SA players
Indonesian expatriate footballers